Lawrence F. Dahl (June 2, 1929 – March 20, 2021) was an R.E. Rundle and Hilldale Professor of Chemistry at the University of Wisconsin–Madison. Dahl was an inorganic chemist, and his research focused on high-nuclearity metallic compounds. He was elected to the National Academy of Sciences in 1988.

Early life and education
Dahl was born in 1929. He earned his B.S. degree from the University of Louisville in 1951 and his Ph.D. from Iowa State University in 1956.

Career
In 1957 Dahl joined the faculty in the chemistry department at the University of Wisconsin–Madison. His laboratory made significant contributions in the synthesis, structure, and bonding of transition metal compounds. Dahl trained 95 Ph.D. candidates, 24 M.S. students, 45 undergraduate research students, and 15 postdoctoral fellows.

Selected awards and distinctions
 1969–1970 – Guggenheim Fellow
 1980 – Elected Fellow of the American Association for the Advancement of Science
 1985 –  Alexander von Humboldt Award
 1988 – Elected to the National Academy of Sciences
 1992 – Elected Fellow of American Academy of Arts and Sciences
 1999 – Willard Gibbs Award
 2010 – F. Albert Cotton Award in Synthetic Inorganic Chemistry
 2014 – Elected Fellow of the American Crystallographic Association

References

External links

 John F. Berry, "Lawrence F. Dahl", Biographical Memoirs of the National Academy of Sciences (2022)

2021 deaths
21st-century American chemists
1929 births
Members of the United States National Academy of Sciences
University of Louisville alumni
Iowa State University alumni
University of Wisconsin–Madison faculty